Hyperplatys aspersa is a species of longhorn beetles of the subfamily Lamiinae. It was described by Say in 1824.

References

Beetles described in 1824
Acanthocinini